Aqib Shah (born 15 October 1995) is a Pakistani first-class cricketer who played for Rawalpindi. For the 2018–19 Quaid-e-Azam Trophy, he was the captain of Zarai Taraqiati Bank Limited. He made his List A debut for Zarai Taraqiati Bank Limited in the 2018–19 Quaid-e-Azam One Day Cup on 13 September 2018.

References

External links
 

1995 births
Living people
Pakistani cricketers
Rawalpindi cricketers
Zarai Taraqiati Bank Limited cricketers
Cricketers from Rawalpindi